The Chengdu Aircraft Research & Design Institute (CADI), or 611 Research and Design Institute, is a design institute and works with the Chengdu Aircraft Industry Group for military aircraft. Built in 1970, it covers an area of 310,000 square meters.

History
In May 1970, the Shenyang design team for the J-9 moved to Chengdu; this was part of the "Third Line" program that moved defence industries to the interior to make them less vulnerable to foreign attack. The team was later renamed as the 611 Institute.

The design work on the cancelled double-canard J-9 influenced later CADI designs. The Chengdu J-10 used the double-canard layout. The Chengdu J-20 also used canards.

Products
 CAC FC-1 / JF-17
 Chengdu J-10
 Chengdu J-20
 CAIG Wing Loong

Sichuan Tengden
Designed by branch Sichuan Tengden
Tengden TB-001

See also
Tu Jida, former chief designer at the institute
 J-XX

References

External links

Aerospace companies of China
Companies based in Chengdu
Chinese companies established in 1970
Research institutes established in 1970
Research institutes in China